Jacob Rascon is an American journalist and a reporter for KTRK-TV in Houston, after moving from competitor station, the NBC affiliate KPRC-TV. Rascon is the son of former news anchor Art Rascon who worked for KTRK-TV from 1998 to 2022, when he stepped down. The pair co-anchored a newscast together before Art retired and Jacob began working on air full time the following day.

Rascon was previously a Dallas-based correspondent for NBC News and before that, a reporter for KNBC, the NBC owned-and-operated station in Los Angeles. Rascon is a member of the Church of Jesus Christ of Latter-day Saints, and he served an LDS Mission in Uruguay after finishing high school. Rascon attended Brigham Young University and Brigham Young University–Idaho. His uncle, Dan Rascon, and his younger brother, Matt Rascon, are also news broadcasters in Salt Lake City at NBC affiliate KSL-TV.

References

Year of birth missing (living people)
Living people
NBC News people
Place of birth missing (living people)
Latter Day Saints from Texas
Television anchors from Houston